Giant cell lichenoid dermatitis is a cutaneous condition usually drug-associated entity, characterized by a lichenoid dermatitis with a granulomatous infiltrate composed of histiocytes and multinucleated giant cells.

See also 
 Lichenoid dermatitis
 List of cutaneous conditions

References 

Lichenoid eruptions